Aspidimerus nigrovittatus, is a species of lady beetle found in Sri Lanka.

Description
Body subovate, and convex. Body color pale yellow with bright, sparse pubescence. Elytra broad on each side with a black ribbon. This ribbon is not touching at the apex.

References 

Coccinellidae
Insects of Sri Lanka
Beetles described in 1866